Birlikte is the name and motto of a series of semi-annual rallies and corresponding cultural festivals against right-wing extremist violence in Germany, which first took place on 9 June 2014 in Cologne. The term "" is Turkish and means "together" (German: "").

Birlikte – Zusammenstehen: 7–9 June 2014 

The first rally " – " (English: "Birlikte – Standing together") was held on Whit Monday, 9 June 2014, on the occurrence of the tenth anniversary of the nail bomb attacks in Cologne. The festival deliberately took place at a spare area at Cologne's , near , the street, where the National Socialist Underground (NSU) attacks had happened a decade earlier.

The event comprised a mixture of speeches and multi-cultural music performances.

Due to the severe supercell thunderstorm Ela the event had to be terminated prematurely, so that some of the planned guests could no longer perform. This included the solo performances of Udo Lindenberg and Peter Maffay. Parts of the abandoned performance of BAP including the approaching thunder storm were published on the 2014 album  (English: "The tale of the unplugged plug").

It was attended by a total of around  people.

Birlikte – Zusammenleben: 14 June 2015 

Originally planned as a one-time event only, the festival was repeated on 14 June 2015 under the modified motto " – " (English: "Birlikte – Living together") following continuing threats by right-wing rallies of Pegida and Kögida, but also, because the longwinded NSU trial still hadn't come to an end.

However, this time the event was limited to one day.
Also, the organizers didn't rely on a large open-air stage as before, instead the number and size of the other stages was increased, so that effectively more people could participate in the festival compared to 2014.

The concert programme was accompanied by various other activities like theatre performances, speeches and public discussions at the Schauspiel Köln/ and in the Keupstraße. According to the organizers, the estimated number of festival visitors was in the s, similar to the numbers a year earlier.

The event started at 11 o'clock in the morning, the last performance ended at 23 o'clock.

Birlikte – Zusammenreden: 27 May – 5 June 2016 
When the festival was held for the third time, this time under the motto " – " (English: "Birlikte – Talking together"), the programme was expanded to include a "week of dialogue" with various events distributed all over the city.

This started on 27 May 2016. The event week aimed at initiating a dialogue between the participants and artists, scientists, intellectuals and members of the city council on the possibilities how to improve ways of living together and to overcome cultural, religious and language barriers.

These activities peaked in a huge whole-day art and cultural festival and a central rally held at Keupstraße and at the Carlswerk on 5 June 2016. On 25 stages more than 400 artists should have performed. However, due to a severe weather warning, the main event in Köln-Mülheim had again to be cancelled at 16 o'clock already.

See also 
 Rock gegen Rechts
 Rock Against Racism
 Wir sind mehr

References

External links 

 
  [12:12]
  [3:38]
  [30:51]

Nonviolence
Anti-fascist organisations in Germany
21st century in Cologne
Cultural festivals in Germany
Festivals of multiculturalism
Music festivals established in 2014
2014 music festivals
2015 music festivals
2016 music festivals
Political terminology in Germany